Klaus Tscheuschner (born October 22, 1956 in Bielefeld, West Germany) was Lord Mayor of Flensburg, Germany from January 2005 until January 2011.

Education and Occupation 

Having graduated from the Bosse Realschule in Bielefeld in 1972, Klaus Tscheuschner did an apprenticeship as a clerical civil servant of the town Bielefeld, during which he worked in different areas until 1992. 1979 he obtained the higher education entrance qualification at the night school in Bielefeld. Afterwards, he studied at the University of applied sciences until 1989 and at the Fachhochschule für öffentliche Verwaltung Nordrhein-Westfalen as well as the Verwaltungsakademie in Ostwestfalen-Lippe. 1992/93 Tscheuschner was Lecturer at the Studieninstitut für kommunale Verwaltung des Landes Brandenburg, before he returned  to his hometown Bielefeld as a personal assistant of the town director.

Public Offices 
Tscheuschner was partyless Lord Mayor of the town Burg auf Fehmarn from 1995 to 2003 and took a stand for a fusion of all towns and municipals on the Fehmarn island into one single town. This goal was achieved on January 1, 2003 by founding the town Fehmarn. Because of this, he was elected Local Politician Of The Year 2002 by the Schleswig-Holsteinischer Zeitungsverlag (Schleswig Holstein Newspaper Agency).

On November 14, 2004, he was elected Lord Mayor of Flensburg, as a candidate for the CDU, during the second round of the election with 59.5% of the votes. He assumed this office in January 2005 and executed it until January 2011. His successor is Simon Faber (SSW).

Family 
Klaus Tscheuschner is married and has two daughters.

Honorary posts 
From 1997 until 2003, he was chairperson of the Ostseebäderverband Schleswig-Holstein. Besides, he was assistant chairperson of the Tourismusverband Schleswig-Holstein.

Literature 
Jörn-Peter Leppien: Kommunalpolitik im deutsch-dänischen Umfeld. Ein Interview mit dem bisherigen Flensburger Oberbürgermeister Klaus Tscheuschner. Grenzfriedenshefte 1/2011, S. 41-52.

External links 

1956 births
Living people
Politicians from Bielefeld
Mayors of Flensburg
Christian Democratic Union of Germany politicians
People from Flensburg
20th-century German civil servants